This article provides a list of Bishops of the Polish National Catholic Church. Despite its name, the Polish National Catholic Church is located in the US, and is not in full communion with the Catholic Church. The church was founded in 1897 in Pennsylvania, by Franciszek Hodur, also the church's first bishop.

List 
 Franciszek Hodur
 Stanley Bilinski
 Francis Bonczak
 Daniel Cyganowski
 Jan Dawidziuk
 Valentine Gawrychowski
 Thomas Gnat
 Leon Grochowski
 John Gritenas for the Lithuanian National Catholic Church
 Casimir Grotnik
 John Zenon Jasinski
 Joseph Kardas
 Joseph Lesniak
 John Mack
 Eugene Magyar for the Slovak National Catholic Church
 Anthony Mikovsky
 John Misiaszek
 Robert M. Nemkovich
 Joseph Nieminski
 Bernard Nowicki
 Józef Padewski
 Thaddeus Peplowski
 Francis Carl Rowinski
 Anthony Rysz
 Walter Slowakiewicz
 Paul Sobiechowski
 Joseph Soltysiak
 John Swantek
 Joseph Tomczyk
 Joseph Zawistowski
 Thaddeus F. Zielinski

References
 John Zenon Jasinski, Apostolic Succession in the Polish National Catholic Church (Scranton: no publisher, no date).

American Old Catholics
+